4-Starr Collection is a promo EP by Ringo Starr & His All Starr Band, issued by Ryko in collaboration with Discover Credit Cards in 1995, catalog number VRCD0264. Tracks one and four were taken from Ringo Starr and His All Starr Band Volume 2: Live from Montreux (recorded in 1992), and tracks two and three were taken from Ringo Starr and His All-Starr Band (recorded in 1989).

Track listing

References

1995 debut EPs
Ringo Starr EPs
1995 live albums
Live EPs
Ringo Starr live albums
Albums produced by Ringo Starr
Rykodisc EPs
Rykodisc live albums
Ringo Starr & His All-Starr Band